The New Hampshire Department of Transportation (NHDOT) is a government agency of the U.S. state of New Hampshire.  The Commissioner of NHDOT is Victoria Sheehan. The main office of the NHDOT is located in the J. O. Morton Building in Concord.

Functions
NHDOT's general functions, as provided in NH RSA:21-L, are:
Planning, developing, and maintaining a state transportation network which will provide for safe and convenient movement of people and goods throughout the state by means of a system of highways and railroads, air service, mass transit and other practicable modes of transportation in order to support state growth and economic development and promote the general welfare of the citizens of the state.
Developing and maintaining state owned land and buildings, except as otherwise provided by law, and cooperating with the New Hampshire Department of Administrative Services in preparing a long-range state capital improvements plan.
Performing any regulation of transportation activities required by law which is not within the jurisdiction of another state agency.

NHDOT operates a 5-1-1 traveler information system online and by phone.

NHDOT shares responsibility with the New Hampshire Division of Historical Resources (DHR) for the New Hampshire historical markers program.

History

From 1905 to 1915, the responsibility for highways and bridges was vested with the State Engineer. From 1915 to 1950, the NHDOT was the "Division to the Highway Department", which was established under Chapter 103 of the New Hampshire Laws of 1915. In 1950, the department became the "New Hampshire Department of Public Works and Highways", established under Part 9 of Chapter 5 of the New Hampshire Laws of 1950.

On February 18, 1986, the Department of Public Works and Highways was reorganized under Chapter 402 of the laws
of 1985 (RSA:21-L), as the Department of Transportation.  This reorganization of the department added the Transportation Division of the Public Utilities Commission (Bureaus of Rail Safety and Common Carriers) and the Aeronautics Commission.

Additional agency reorganization under Chapter 257 of the New Hampshire Laws of 2004 changed the Division of Aeronautics to the Division of Aeronautics, Rail, and Transit.

Divisions
Under the 1986 reorganization plan, five divisions were created within the department:

Project Development
Plans and designs transportation projects and oversees their construction

Operations
The NHDOT's largest Division is responsible for the maintenance of state highways and bridges, and the maintenance and operation of the State's turnpike system

Administration
Is responsible for support activities in the Department, including accounting, auditing, purchasing, budgeting, contracts, information technology and the print shop

Division of Aeronautics, Rail and Transit
Works with Federal, state and local agencies to preserve and promote various modes of transportation outside of the mode of automobile/truck and highways

Regional planning
NHDOT shares planning authority with the following Metropolitan Planning Organizations and Regional Planning Commissions, which allocate federal funding:

 Central New Hampshire Regional Planning Commission
 Lakes Region Planning Commission
 Nashua Regional Planning Commission
 North Country Council
 Rockingham Planning Commission
 Southern New Hampshire Planning Commission
 Southwest Region Planning Commission
 Strafford Regional Planning Commission
 Upper Valley-Lake Sunapee Regional Planning Commission

See also
New Hampshire Rail Transit Authority

References

External links

Interactive map of bridges in New Hampshire from NHDOT

Transportation
Transportation in New Hampshire
State departments of transportation of the United States
Government agencies established in 1986
1986 establishments in New Hampshire
Toll road authorities of the United States